Karl Witzell (18 October 1884, Hiersfeld near Wesel – 31 May 1976, Berlin) was a German naval officer who rose to General Admiral and head of the Marinewaffenhauptamt during the Second World War.

Decorations
 Knight's Cross of the Order of the Dannebrog
 Friedrich August Cross, Second and First Class
 Prussian Service award
 Iron Cross (1914)
 2nd Class
 1st Class
 Honour Cross of the World War 1914/1918
 Wehrmacht Long Service Award 4th to 1st Class with Oak Leaves
 Iron Cross (1939)
 2nd Class
 1st Class
 War Merit Cross with Swords
 2nd Class
 1st Class
 Knight's Cross of the War Merit Cross with Swords on 6 October 1942 as Generaladmiral and Chef des Marinewaffenhauptamtes

Bibliography 

1884 births
1976 deaths
People from Wesel
Military personnel from North Rhine-Westphalia
People from the Rhine Province
General admirals of the Kriegsmarine
Imperial German Navy personnel of World War I
Counter admirals of the Reichsmarine
German prisoners of war in World War II held by the Soviet Union
Recipients of the clasp to the Iron Cross, 1st class
Recipients of the Knights Cross of the War Merit Cross
Knights of the Order of the Dannebrog